James A. Jamieson (April 21, 1943 – December 5, 2018) was an American professional golfer who played on the PGA Tour in the 1970s.

Biography
Jamieson was born in Kalamazoo, Michigan and raised in Moline, Illinois. He started playing golf at age 7 at Oakwood Country Club in Moline. He attended Oklahoma State University, where he was an All-American and a member of the 1963 NCAA Championship golf team. Jamieson served in Vietnam before turning pro in 1968 and joining the PGA Tour in 1970.

Jamieson played in about 180 PGA Tour events from 1970 to 1978. His career year was 1972 when he won the Western Open and had eight other top-10 finishes in PGA Tour events including a T-5 at The Masters and a T-2 at the PGA Championship. He had four top-6 finishes in major championships between 1971 and 1973. Jamieson played with Tom Weiskopf in the 1972 World Cup in Melbourne, Australia, finishing tied for fourth place with Australia.

Jamieson was forced to retire from the PGA Tour after he fell and broke his hand at a hotel in Phoenix in 1977. After the injury, he became the head club pro at the Greenbrier Hotel in White Sulphur Springs, West Virginia, a position once held by Sam Snead. He also chaired the Ryder Cup when it was held at the Greenbrier in 1979. Other stints in Jamieson's career as a teaching and club pro have included lead instructor at the John Jacobs Golf School, head pro at The Pines Golf Club, head pro at the Pete Dye Golf Club, Director of Golf at Whitewater Golf Club in Thunder Bay, Ontario, and as operator of the Jim Jamieson School of Golf at the Resort at Glade Springs in Daniels, West Virginia. He also owned two golf courses for about 6 years.

Jamieson died on December 5, 2018.

Amateur wins
1961 Waterloo Amateur
1967 Illinois State Amateur

Professional wins (1)

PGA Tour wins (1)

Results in major championships

Note: Jamieson never played in The Open Championship.

CUT = missed the half-way cut
WD = withdrew
"T" indicates a tie for a place

U.S. national team appearances
Professional
World Cup: 1972

See also 

 Fall 1968 PGA Tour Qualifying School graduates

References

External links 

The Jim Jamieson School of Golf

American male golfers
Oklahoma State Cowboys golfers
PGA Tour golfers
Golfers from Michigan
Golfers from Illinois
Golfers from West Virginia
The Greenbrier people
Sportspeople from Kalamazoo, Michigan
People from Moline, Illinois
1943 births
2018 deaths